The 1981 WAFU Club Championship was the fifth football club tournament season that took place for the runners-up of each West African country's domestic league, the West African Club Championship. It was won by Stella Club d'Adjamé in two-legged final victory against AS Police of Dakar, Senegal.  Runner-up was AS Police of Senegal.  Originally to be an 18 match season, after the forfeiture of Ghana's Eleven Wise, it was reduced to a 16 match season. A total of 34 goals were scored.

Preliminary round
The matches took place from May 31 to June 14.

|}

Intermediary Round
The matches took place from August 16 and 20.

|}

Semifinals
The matches took place from September 20 to 27

|}

Finals
The matches took place on 4 and 18 October.

|}

Winners

See also
1981 African Cup of Champions Clubs
1981 CAF Cup Winners' Cup

References

External links
Full results of the 1981 WAFU Cup at RSSSF

West African Club Championship
1981 in African football